Minecraft: The Story of Mojang is a 2012 documentary film directed by Paul Owens. It is about the history of the company Mojang and its creation, Minecraft. The film features interviews with company personnel such as Markus Persson and Jens Bergensten and insights from people involved in the gaming industry and from players profoundly impacted by the game. The film was produced by 2 Player Productions. The production was funded through a Kickstarter campaign and spanned nearly two years in locations across North America and Europe.

The film premiered on Xbox Live on December 22, 2012, and was made available for download and streaming the following day.  2 Player Productions also uploaded the documentary to torrent index The Pirate Bay, but urged people to consider purchasing the film.

Content 
The documentary follows Minecraft developer Mojang through the development process of the game. The film also features insights from many people in the video gaming industry to discuss Minecrafts popularity and influence. Interviews from Persson and other Mojang employees give an insight on the creation and expansion of the studio.

Soundtrack 
The film's soundtrack was created by Daniel Rosenfeld, who has also created most of the music and sounds for the game. The music featured was released on Rosenfeld's album One, which contains 31 tracks. The CD features remixes by crashfaster, Danimal Cannon, Bud Melvin and minusbaby. It also features vocals by Laura Shigihara.

References

External links
 
 

Minecraft in popular culture
2012 films
Documentary films about video games
Kickstarter-funded documentaries
Crowdfunded films
Markus Persson